Thomas Nykopp (born March 6, 1993) is a Finnish ice hockey player. He is currently playing with HIFK in the Finnish Liiga.

Nykopp made his SM-liiga debut playing with HIFK during the 2012–13 season.

References

External links

1993 births
Living people
Finnish ice hockey forwards
HIFK (ice hockey) players
Tri-City Storm players
Ice hockey people from Helsinki